Dominic Mulaisho (born 15 August 1933 in Feira, Zambia – died Lusaka, Zambia 1 July 2013) was a Zambian novelist and civil servant. He was the Governor of the Bank of Zambia from 1992 to 1995.

He is also known for his two novels The Tongue of the Dumb (1973) and The Smoke that Thunders (1979).

He was educated at University College of Rhodesia.

References 

1933 births
Governors of Bank of Zambia
Zambian novelists
People from Luangwa District
2013 deaths
University of Zimbabwe alumni